Star Clipper is a four masted barquentine built as a cruise ship, and operated by Star Clippers Ltd of Sweden. She is the first clipper ship in this class since 1912. She is classed by Lloyds 100A1

A luxury vessel, she sails under the Maltese flag.

See also 

 Royal Clipper
 Star Flyer
 Flying Clipper
 List of cruise ships   
 List of large sailing vessels

References

External links

 Official website of Star Clippers, the operator of the ship
 "In seventh heaven" – review in The Australian of a cruise on the Star Clipper
 "Star Clipper" – review by Douglas Ward in The Daily Telegraph, London
 "Under sail on the Star Clipper" – review by Betsa Marsh in the Miami Herald
 Star Clipper at Shipspotting.com.

Ships built in Belgium
1992 ships
Barquentines
Passenger ships of Sweden